The 1523 Battle of al-Shihr was a military confrontation between Portuguese forces and those of the Sultanate of Kathiri, the capital of which was Shihr (Xael in Portuguese). 

The Portuguese were victorious. Shihr was assaulted and sacked.

The battle
In 1523, the Portuguese governor of India, Dom Duarte de Meneses, dispatched his brother, Dom Luís de Meneses, to the Red Sea with a force of 6 galleons. Dom Luis was tasked with delivering an ambassador to the Christian Emperor of Ethiopia and hunting hostile Muslim trade ships sailing between the Indian Ocean and Jeddah. Along the way, he called at the city of al-Shihr.

In the city's harbour, Dom Luís found a Portuguese merchant ship whose proprietors reported that the local emir had killed and seized the goods of the Portuguese merchant Afonso da Veiga four or five months earlier. Dom Luís demanded the stolen goods, but when the inhabitants refused he made ready to attack.

The Portuguese landed early in the morning. The city's defenders attempted to face them on the beaches, but they were routed and the emir Mutran b. Mansur was killed in battle with a bullet. The Portuguese then successfully assaulted and sacked the town while the inhabitants fled. Shihr was further plundered by the settlement's garrison, and by vagrants.

Besides the town's emir, other distinguished persons including the sheikh Ahmad b. Abdullah b. Abd al-Rahman Bal-Hadjdj Ba Fadl, the sheikh Ahmad b. Ridwan Ba Fadl, his brother Fadl, and the scholar Yakub b. Salih b. Rahmah al-Huraidi were slain in the action.

See also
 Battle of al-Shihr (1548)

References

Sieges involving Portugal
16th century in Portuguese India
Conflicts in 1523